The Crown of Bolesław I the Brave (in Polish korona Chrobrego, also known in Latin as the corona privilegiata) was the coronation crown of the Polish monarchs.

History 
The exact origins of the Polish crown are unknown. According to legend, the story dates back to the Congress of Gniezno in the year 1000 AD, when Bolesław I the Brave, Duke of Poland, received from Otto III, Holy Roman Emperor a replica of the Holy Lance and a crown, both symbolising royal power. The destination the crown was lost over the course of time, Possibly taken to Germany in 1036 by Queen Richeza. It was only in 1320 that a new set of regalia was prepared for the coronation of King Ladislaus the Short and survived until the 18th century.

The crown along with the crown jewels was kept in the cathedral treasury at Wawel Castle. During the reign of the Jagiellon dynasty it was moved to the Crown Treasury of the castle. The crown was often removed from the Wawel, for example in 1370, when Louis I of Hungary took it away, returning in 1412. In the 17th century the crown was moved to Warsaw for the coronations of the queens. During the Deluge in the years 1655-1661, the crown was hidden away in Stará Ľubovňa Castle in today's Slovakia. In the 18th century it moved around again, particularly to Silesia and Moravia. Although returned to Wawel Castle in 1730, only three years later it was taken again to Warsaw. In 1734 the crown was left at the Pauline Jasna Góra Monastery, where it remained until 1736. On the occasion of the coronation of Stanisław August Poniatowski on November 25, 1764 in St. John's Cathedral, Warsaw, the crown was transported from Kraków to Warsaw for the last time. It returned to Wawel Castle where it remained until its theft.

The seizure of Kraków by the Prussian army in 1794 had dramatic consequences. The crown treasury was plundered and the royal insignia robbed and later melted down on the order of King Frederick William II of Prussia. Out of the gold, a number of coins were minted. Of all the Polish crown regalia, only the sword Szczerbiec would survive.

Based on historical drawings, paintings, descriptions and using a number of Prussian coins believed to have been minted from the gold of the crown in 1811, a team led by Adam Orzechowski of Nowy Sącz produced a recreation in 2001-2003 .

The crown was 10 inches high, with 7.8 in. external diameter and 7.3 in. internal diameter, weighing around 2.82 pounds . 

References

Further reading 
 Jürgen Abeler. Kronen. Herrschaftszeichen der Welt. Düsseldorf, 1980 
 Karol Estreicher. Zniszczenie polskich insygniów koronnych. Kraków, Przegląd Współczesny. 1935 
 Karol Estreicher. The Mystery of the Polish Crown Jewels. London, Alliance Press Limited. 1945?
 Jerzy Lileyko. Regalia Polskie. Warsaw 1987.  
 Janusz Miniewicz. Tajemnica polskich koron. Czy jest szansa ich odnalezienia? Nowy Sącz 2006.  
 Michał Rożek. Tajemnice insygniów królewskich. Kraków, 1985. 
 Michał Rożek. Polskie koronacje i korony. Kraków 1987.  
 Alfred Znamierowski. Insygnia, symbole i herby polskie. Warsaw, 2003. 
 Marek Żukow-Karczewski, Klejnoty i insygnia koronacyjne w dawnej Polsce. Prawdy i legendy (Crown jewels and insignia in the former Poland. Truth and legend), "Życie Literackie", no. 32, 1987, p. 5

External links 

  The history of the replica of the Polish Coronation Regalia
__notoc__

Bolesław I the Brave
Polish crown jewels
Medieval crowns